Aimeric or Aymeric or Aimery (from Haimirich or Amalric) is a male given name:

 Aimeric de Belenoi (fl. 1215–1242), troubadour 
 Prince Aymeric of Belgium (born 2005)
 Aymeric Jaubert de Barrault (died 1613), mayor of Bordeaux.
 Aymeric Jett Montaz (born 2004), French-Canadian actor
 Aymeric Laporte (born 1994), French footballer who plays for Manchester City F.C.
 Aimery of Limoges
 Aimerico Manrique de Lara, Aimeric or Aymeric, sometimes Gallicised as Aimery
 Aymeri de Narbonne, legendary hero of France
 Aimery II of Narbonne (d. 1134), Viscount of Narbonne
 Aimery III of Narbonne (d. 1239), known in Spanish as Aimerico Pérez de Lara, Viscount of Narbonne
 Aimery IV of Narbonne (Amerigo di Narbona) (c. 1230 – 1298), Viscount of Narbonne, an Italian condottiero
 Ademar de Peiteus (Aimeric de Peiteus)
 Adémar II de Poitiers (Aimeric de Peiteus), Count of Valentinois
 Aimeric de Peguilhan (c. 1170 – c. 1230), troubadour
 Aimeric de Sarlat (fl. c. 1200), troubadour